is a Japanese manga series by author Ken Akamatsu. The story follows Hitoshi Kōbe, a high school guy who isn't good at anything but programming. He creates a program in particular named Program 30 which is that of a female, and is shocked when she comes to life in the real world due to a lightning storm. Hitoshi names her Saati and teaches her about the real world, while she instructs him on how to properly have a girlfriend. Things get more complex however when two more of Hitoshi's programs come to life, and a hacker goes after Saati's program. A.I. Love You was first serialized through Weekly Shōnen Magazine in 1994, but later moved to Magazine Special where it ended in 1997. The series was collected into nine manga volumes that were also released by Kodansha between 1994 and 1997. Two re-releases followed; however, each time a volume was deducted.

In 2003, Tokyopop acquired the license to release the series in North America. The story's title was changed but Tokyopop tried to keep a pun that had been used in the original Japanese title. Eight English language manga volumes were released between February 3, 2004, and April 12, 2005. The volumes were printed until 2009 when Tokyopop announced that the series would go out of print. The English adaptation was well received, and although reviewers pointed out that Akamatsu's artwork was not at the professional level yet, they praised the story and characters.

Plot

The story centres on Hitoshi Kōbe, a 1st year in high school that is described as quite average, and fails miserably in academic, athletic and social situations.

Hitoshi has only one thing going for him - his ability to program computers. In fact, he is so good at this he has created programs that can rewrite themselves - Artificial Intelligence, in other words. So far he has created thirty of these programs, and the latest - whom he names Saati ( The Japanese pronunciation of the English word "Thirty" )- is so advanced that conversation with her is indistinguishable from a normal girl.

However, there is still the barrier of Hitoshi being in the physical world and Saati being a program, until one day a freak lightning strike materializes her into the real world, where she becomes the girlfriend of Hitoshi. The series then follows their now not so ordinary lives, as well as other A.I.s of Hitoshi's creation as they attempt to keep Saati's secret while she adapts to the lifestyle of humans.

Release

A.I. Love You was serialized through manga magazine Weekly Shōnen Magazine in 1994 starting in the 18th issue, and going until Issue 40. Publisher Kodansha then switched the manga to Magazine Special where the series ended in 1997. The chapters were collected into nine tankōbon volumes between September 16, 1994 and October 17, 1997. The series was subsequently re-released by Kodansha through KC Deluxe from November, 1999 to June, 2000 this time though with eight volumes. The final re-release took place between November 17, 2004, and June 17, 2005 again by Kodansha, but with seven volumes.

In June 2003, A.I. Love You showed up on Tokyopop's website but was removed shortly after. Tokyopop announced a month later though at Anime Expo 2003 that it had officially licensed the series for an English language release in North America. The first volume released came out on February 3, 2004, altogether eight volumes were released. Tokyopop released the final volume on April 12, 2005, and continued printing the series up until August 31, 2009 when it was announced that all eight volumes would be out of print. Although discontinued, the company offered returns for those who desired up until March 1, 2010. The discontinuation was a result of Kodansha letting its licenses expire with Tokyopop which led to the removal of some of company's biggest titles.

Naming

The original Japanese title, A・I が止まらない! (A.I. ga Tomaranai!), is a play on words. While it roughly means "Cant Stop Love" the word "A.I." has several meanings. Tokyopop does their best to recreate this pun with their US release of the series in which this case they added "Love You" to create a pun referring to the statement "I Love You" in A.(I. Love You).

Reception
The English language adaptation of the manga series has received reviews from various media outlets that provide feedback, and reception in regards to manga. Samantha from Manga Life gave the first book an A rating calling it a "very deep series". When talking about the characters she says that they all have bright personalities, and are overall loveable. Allen Divers from Anime News Network also gave the first volume a review calling the story predictable. Allen goes on to say though that the simple love story aside from the fan service "can keep the ladies happy as well". In his review of the first volume, Mike Dungan from Mania.com called the story "amateurish" saying that they have predictable plots to them. Mike praises the English release though for being far better when it comes to the artwork, and design than the original Japanese release. He finishes his review saying that while the artwork isn't yet at the Love Hina level, (This was Akamatsu's first manga) Ken's fans "won't want to do without it" citing the evolution of Akamatsu's artwork.

References

External links

A.I. Love Network - Ken Akamatsu site. 
A.I. Love You at Kodansha
 
A.I. Love You at Tokyopop. (Archived)
 

Ken Akamatsu
Kodansha manga
Robot comics
School life in anime and manga
Shōnen manga
Tokyopop titles